Modernist poetry refers to poetry written between 1890 and 1950 in the tradition of modernist literature, but the dates of the term depend upon a number of factors, including the nation of origin, the particular school in question, and the biases of the critic setting the dates. The critic/poet C. H. Sisson observed in his essay Poetry and Sincerity that "Modernity has been going on for a long time. Not within living memory has there ever been a day when young writers were not coming up, in a threat of iconoclasm."

Background

It is usually said to have begun with the French Symbolist movement and it artificially ends with the Second World War,  the beginning and ending of the modernist period are of course arbitrary. Poets like W. B. Yeats (1865–1939) and Rainer Maria Rilke (1875–1926) started in a post-Romantic, Symbolist vein and modernised their poetic idiom after being affected by political and literary developments. Imagism proved radical and important, marking a new point of departure for poetry. Some consider that it began in the works of Hardy and Pound, Eliot and Yeats, Williams and Stevens. English-language poets, like T. S. Eliot, Ezra Pound, Robert Frost, Basil Bunting ('a born modernist'), Wallace Stevens, and E. E. Cummings also went on to produce work after World War II.

Nature of modernism
Modernism emerged with its insistent breaks with the immediate past, its different inventions, 'making it new' with elements from cultures remote in time and space. The questions of impersonality and objectivity seem to be crucial to Modernist poetry. Modernism developed out of a tradition of lyrical expression, emphasising the personal imagination, culture, emotions, and memories of the poet. For the modernists, it was essential to move away from the merely personal towards an intellectual statement that poetry could make about the world. Even when they reverted to the personal, like T. S. Eliot in the Four Quartets and Ezra Pound in The Cantos, they distilled the personal into a poetic texture that claimed universal human significance. Herbert Read said of it, "The modern poet has no essential alliance with regular schemes of any sorts. They reserve the right to adapt their rhythm to their mood, to modulate their metre as they progress. Far from seeking freedom and irresponsibility (implied by the unfortunate term free verse) they seek a stricter discipline of exact concord of thought and feeling."

After World War II, a new generation of poets sought to revoke the effort of their predecessors towards impersonality and objectivity. In the English language modernism ends with the turn towards confessional poetry in the work of Robert Lowell and Sylvia Plath, among others.

See also
Modernism
Modernist poetry in English
List of modernist poets
Modernismo
Dada
Expressionism
Imagism
Vers libre
Symbolism (arts)	
The Blue Rider
Oulipo

References

Further reading
Wesling, Donald,The Chances of Rhyme: Devices and Modernity - UC Press E-Books 1988
Perkins, David, A History of Modern Poetry: modernism and after  Harvard Press, New Haven 1987 
Scully, James (ed) Modern Poets on Modern Poetry, Fontana 1970 
Steele, Timothy, Missing Measures: modern poetry and the revolt against metre, University of Arlansas, 1990 

Poetic forms
Modernism

sl:Moderna